Wielka Żuława or Wielki Ostrów is the largest island in Lake Jeziorak and one of the largest mainland islands in Poland. Administratively it belongs to Iława. The island has six resorts.

On the south-eastern shore of the island, there are relics of a medieval Teutonic stronghold serving as a small watchtower and the period of use of which dates back to the 13th century. In the Middle Ages a wooden bridge connected the island to the mainland. At the very top of the hillfort there are remains of a small Protestant cemetery from the 19th century.

Wielka Żuława was the filming place of Gniazdo (The Cradle), a 1974 historical drama film about the reign of Mieszko I of Poland, directed by Jan Rybkowski.

See also
Iława
Jeziorak

References

Islands of Poland